Hye is an unincorporated community in western Blanco County, Texas, United States. According to the Handbook of Texas, the community had a population of 105 in 2000. Hye is part of the Texas-German belt and in very conservative rural Texas.

History
The first settlers came to the area in 1860 when several farmers and ranchers moved to Rocky Creek, located three miles east of the community. It continued to grow when German and Anglo settlers came to the area throughout the 1860s and 70s. Hiram ("Hye") G. Brown and his parents settled in the Rocky Creek area of Blanco County, circa 1872. He constructed a small store and house near the Pedernales River on the Austin-Fredericksburg road. Brown was appointed postmaster upon getting a post office established in his store on April 17, 1886. The post office was named Hye for him. The establishment of the post office drew other businesses to the area, eventually bringing in a grist mill, a blacksmith shop, and a cotton gin. In 1904, Brown erected a new building for the store and post office. In 1965, on the porch of the Hye post office, Lyndon B. Johnson swore in Lawrence F. O'Brien as United States Postmaster General. Johnson's boyhood home is located nearby and is reported to be where he mailed his first letter at the post office when he was just four years old. The community's population was 200 during the 1920s and 30s, dropped to 50 during World War II, grew to 90 in 1947, its zenith of 140 in 1968, and settled at 105 from 1970 through 2000.

In 1966, the Hye General Store and Post Office was designated a Recorded Texas Historic Landmark, marker number 2607.

The Garrison Brothers Distillery also operates in the community.

Geography

Climate
The climate in this area is characterized by hot, humid summers and generally mild to cool winters. According to the Köppen Climate Classification system, Hye has a humid subtropical climate, abbreviated "Cfa" on climate maps.

Education
Hye is served by the Johnson City Independent School District.

See also

References

External links

Unincorporated communities in Blanco County, Texas
Recorded Texas Historic Landmarks
Unincorporated communities in Texas